Mathilde Ludovika, Duchess in Bavaria (30 September 1843 – 18 June 1925) was the fourth daughter of Maximilian, Duke in Bavaria and Princess Ludovika of Bavaria. Her mother was the youngest daughter of King Maximilian I Joseph of Bavaria by his second wife Margravine Karoline of Baden.

Early life
Born and raised at Possenhofen Castle, Mathilde was a younger sister of (among others) Duke Karl-Theodor in Bavaria, Duchess Elisabeth in Bavaria and Duchess Marie Sophie in Bavaria. She was an older sister of (among others) Duchess Sophie in Bavaria. Her godmother and namesake was her mother's niece Grand Duchess Mathilde of Hesse and by Rhine.

Marriage and family
On 5 June 1861, Mathilde married Prince Lodovico of Bourbon Two-Siclies, Count of Trani. He was heir presumptive to his older half-brother Francis II of the Two Sicilies. Francis was married to her older sister Marie Sophie. The bride was seventeen years old and the groom was twenty-two. They had one child, a daughter:

Princess Maria Teresa Maddalena of Bourbon-Two Sicilies (15 January 1867 – 1 May 1909). She married Prince Wilhelm of Hohenzollern-Sigmaringen.

Allegedly, during the early years of her marriage, Mathilde had an affair with the Spanish diplomat , 1st Duke of Ripalda and Santa Lucía, with whom she had a daughter at the Villa Farnesina in Rome:

María Salvadora Bermúdez de Castro (20 January 1864 – 18 September 1945), later 2nd Duchess of Santa Lucía. Sent to Brighton immediately after her birth, she was raised by her paternal family and legally adopted by her father only in 1879; she probably never saw her mother. She married Alvaro Pérez de Barradas y Fernández de Cordoba, 12th Marquess of Peñaflor.

Two Sicilies Revolution
However, the Two Sicilies were conquered by the Expedition of the Thousand under Giuseppe Garibaldi in 1861. Garibaldi served the Kingdom of Sardinia which was in the process of Italian unification.

Lodovico was still the heir of Francis as head of a deposed Royal House. He retained this position for the rest of his life but predeceased Francis on 8 June 1886. Francis was eventually succeeded by their younger brother Prince Alfonso, Count of Caserta. Mathilde survived her husband by thirty-nine years but never remarried.

Ancestry

References

Sources
"The Book of Kings: A Royal Genealogy" by C. Arnold McNaughton.

External links

Her profile in Peerage.com

1843 births
1925 deaths
People from Starnberg (district)
House of Wittelsbach
Princesses of Bourbon-Two Sicilies
Duchesses in Bavaria
German Roman Catholics
Royal reburials